Edward William Richards (c. 1878 – c. 1928) was a rugby union player who represented Australia.

Richards, a lock, was born in Vegetable Creek, New South Wales and claimed a total of 5 international rugby caps for Australia. His debut game was against Great Britain, at Sydney, on 2 July 1904.

References

Australian rugby union players
Australia international rugby union players
Year of birth uncertain
Year of death uncertain
Rugby union players from New South Wales
Rugby union locks